Thomas Flavel (1793 – July 1829) was an English professional cricketer who played first-class cricket from 1821 to 1828.

An all-rounder who bowled and kept wicket, Flavel was mainly associated with Surrey.  He made 22 known appearances in first-class matches and represented the Players in the Gentlemen v Players series.

References

External links

Further reading
 H S Altham, A History of Cricket, Volume 1 (to 1914), George Allen & Unwin, 1962
 Arthur Haygarth, Scores & Biographies, Volumes 1-11 (1744–1870), Lillywhite, 1862–72

1793 births
1829 deaths
English cricketers
English cricketers of 1787 to 1825
English cricketers of 1826 to 1863
Players cricketers
Surrey cricketers
Godalming Cricket Club cricketers
Marylebone Cricket Club cricketers